The Independent Spirit Award for New Scripted Series (or Best New Series) is one of the annual Independent Spirit Awards, presented to recognize the best in independent filmmaking.

History
It was first awarded in 2020 with Michaela Coel's miniseries I May Destroy You being the first recipient of the award.

Criteria
Only first season series are eligible to compete, international series can compete as long as at least three episode aired on a US broadcaster within the calendar year.

Recipients

2020s

References

Best New Scripted Film
American television awards
Awards established in 2020